2009–2010 NBB season was the second season of Novo Basquete Brasil, the Brazilian basketball league. It started on November 1, 2009, and was disputed by fourteen teams playing each other in round and runoff in the regular season. At the end of the regular season the first four teams qualify for the quarterfinals of the playoffs automatically now the team who finish between 5th and 12th positions will participate in the first round of the playoffs to define the other four teams in the quarterfinals.

Participating teams 
 Londrina
 Franca
 Paulistano
 Araraquara
 Assis Basket
 Bauru
 São José
 Pinheiros
 Flamengo
 Saldanha da Gama
 CETAF Vila Velha
 Brasília
 Joinville
 Minas

Regular season 

Classification

Playoffs - first round

Joinville (5) vs. (12) Araraquara

Game 1

Game 2

Game 3

Pinheiros (6) vs. (11) Paulistano

Game 1

Game 2

Game 3

São José (7) vs. (10) Araraquara

Game 1

Game 2

Game 3

Game 4

Bauru (8) vs. (9) Assis

Game 1

Game 2

Game 3

Playoffs

Quarterfinals

Brasília (1) vs. (8) Bauru

Game 1

Game 2

Game 3

Flamengo (2) vs. (7) São José

Game 1

Game 2

Game 3

Franca (3) vs. (6) Pinheiros

Game 1

Game 2

Game 3

Minas (4) vs. (5) Joinville

Game 1

Game 2

Game 3

Semifinals

Brasília (1) vs. (4) Minas

Game 1

Game 2

Game 3

Game 4

Game 5

Flamengo (2) vs. (3) Franca

Game 1

Game 2

Game 3

Game 4

Finals

Brasília (1) vs. (2) Flamengo

Game 1

Game 2

Game 3

Game 4

Game 5

Awards 
 MVP - Marcelinho Machado (Flamengo)
 Sixth Player - Nezinho dos Santos (Brasília)
 Best Defender - Alex Garcia (Brasília)
 Revelation - Raulzinho (Minas)
 Most Improved Player - Audrei Parizotto (Joinville)
 Coach - Lula Ferreira (Brasília)

All-Team

References 

Novo Basquete Brasil seasons
NBB
Brazil